Rolf Loeber (June 5, 1942 – November 6, 2017) was a Dutch-born American psychologist and criminologist who specialized in the study of juvenile delinquency. At the time of his death in 2017, he was Distinguished Professor of Psychiatry, Psychology, and Epidemiology at the University of Pittsburgh, where he had taught since 1984. He was also a Professor of Juvenile Delinquency and Social Development at the Free University of Amsterdam in the Netherlands. Along with his wife and collaborator, Magda Stouthamer-Loeber, he was the co-founder and co-director of the University of Pittsburgh's Life History Studies Program. He was elected to the Royal Irish Academy in 2008.

References

External links
Faculty page

1942 births
2017 deaths
American criminologists
20th-century American psychologists
Dutch emigrants to the United States
University of Pittsburgh faculty
Academic staff of Vrije Universiteit Amsterdam
Members of the Royal Irish Academy
People from Hilversum